Lagos de Moreno is a city and municipality in the State of Jalisco, Mexico. Lagos is located in the region of Los Altos de Jalisco, within the macroregion of the Bajío, one of the most highly developed areas in Latin America. Lagos de Moreno is occasionally known as the "Athens of Jalisco", owing to the numerous writers and poets who were born there.

Lagos de Moreno was founded as Villa Santa Maria de los Lagos on March 31, 1563, by Don Hernando Martel, an Andalusian conquistador. The town was the economic and cultural center of a region that eventually attracted many ranchers. By 1600 there were over 20,000 cattle in the region. Santa Maria continued growing both physically and culturally, and by the 1800s, the town was elevated to a city and renamed to Lagos de Moreno in honor of Pedro Moreno. Lagos de Moreno was the site of the signing of several important political documents, the two identically named but unrelated Convenios de Lagos. The arts flourished in the city during the latter half of the 19th century, but this literary boom decreased somewhat after the Mexican Revolution, especially during the 1940s. Recently, Lagos de Moreno has become an important cultural and tourist destination thanks to its rich history and architecture, some of which still stands from the 17th century.

As of the 2010 census, the city had a population of 153,818 inhabitants, making it the 6th largest city in the state of Jalisco. The estimate for the population in 2015 is 164,981 people. The city serves as the municipal seat of the municipality, which has an area of 2,648.22 km2 (1,022.48 sq mi) and a population of 153,817 inhabitants, and includes many other outlying small communities, the largest of which are Paso de Cuarenta (San Miguel de Cuarenta) and Los Azulitos.

Etymology 
The conquistador Hernando Martel gave Lagos de Moreno its original name, Villa de Santa Maria de los Lagos (Town of Saint Mary of the Lakes). The town's name was derived from Saint Mary, the townspeople's chosen patron saint, and the numerous lakes that used to be scattered across the valley. The town was renamed on April 9, 1829, as Lagos de Moreno in honor of Mexican independence hero Pedro Moreno, who was born in the city.

History

Pre-hispanic era 
The origins of Lagos de Moreno date to its founding as Pechichitlán or Teziziatlan by Ahnuvic VII in about 1028 BCE. Then the city served as a capital for the Chichimecatlalli fiefdom. In the 12th century, semi-nomadic Guachichiles occupied the valley and dominated an extensive area stretching from present-day San Juan de los Lagos to southern Coahuila. Before the colonization of Mexico began, indigenous culture thrived in this area, with notable pre-Hispanic architecture being established at Rincón de Mesa, Sauceda, and El Maguey.

Colonial era 
After the fall of the Aztec Empire, explorers set out to explore the western frontier in the Bajio Region. The Spanish expansion in Nueva Galicia was slowed down by several tribes in the vicinity, such as the semi-nomadic Chichimecas and the Guachichiles. To the east of Pechititan, the Guamares inhabited the Guanajuato area, and to the west, the Zacatecos lived. The Zacateco caudillos (chiefs), Xiconaqui and Custique, along with the Chichimecas, struck down multiple Spanish invasions from 1550 to 1590 in the well-known Chichimeca War.

However, encomenderos gradually occupied the Bajio. The first Spaniard to build a hacienda in the Laguense valley was Don Diego de Ibarra. Even so, in 1551, a group of Chichimecas attacked his ranch (La Sauceda and San Antonio) and killed all his animals. The constant raids in the area made, for the time being, made settlement of the Lagos region impossible.

Founding of Lagos 

After decades of constant combat and raids, the first Spanish authorities of the region were appointed; the priest of Teocaltiche and the Mayor of Teocaltiche had the region stretching from Teocaltiche to the Lagos valley as their jurisdiction. Later, the Royal Audiencia of Nueva Galicia ordered the Mayor of Teocaltiche, Don Hernando Martel from Seville, to establish a town in the vicinity of Pechichitan. The new settlement was founded jointly with the first priest and vicar of the local parish, father Juan de Cuenca Virues, who also participated in the official founding of the Real Comanja mine in 1561. As such, on March 31, 1563, Villa de Santa María de los Lagos was founded by Martel, Cuenca, and Captain Don Pedro de Anda, along with 72 or 73 Spanish noble families and their servants and slaves.

Development

The residents of Santa Maria chose the Virgin Mary as the namesake of their town and Saint Sebastian as a minor patron saint. The settlement and its surroundings became quite appealing to ranchers; by 1600 around 20,000 head of cattle were active in the Lagos valley, facilitating the eventual creation of the charreria-style rodeo. The increasing population of the area contributed to the naming of the first ordinary Mayor of Santa Maria de los Lagos, the miner Pedro Marfil from Guanajuato. Marfil would be succeeded by Gonzalo Vazquez Baladez, the first and only clergyman to-date to serve as mayor of the town.

The town continued to grow steadily in the 17th century, benefiting from the general prosperity of the Golden Age of the Spanish Empire. In 1615, a new jail was inaugurated, and 1621 saw the construction of a third parish temple with a tower that would be completed by 1685. Religious buildings were created often during this period; the Convent of the Poor Capuchins of Saint Joseph was founded and the construction of the Parish Church of Our Lady of the Assumption and the Temple of Our Lady of the Rosary began during this time.

Mexican War of Independence 
Santa Maria de los Lagos, like the rest of New Spain, underwent rapid political change in the early 1800s. The lawyer Francisco Primo de Verdad y Ramos spoke to Spanish authorities, advocating for Mexican independence. He died under mysterious circumstances in the dungeon of the Mexico City Trustee building. In the initial phase of the war, Father Miguel Hidalgo y Costilla visited Santa Maria de los Lagos and provided religious services there, and recruited some families for the fight against the forces of the Spanish Viceroy.

Independence to present 

In 1823, the Convenio de Lagos (Agreement of Lagos) was signed in Santa Maria by Nicolas Bravo, Pedro Celestino Negrete, and Luis Quintanar, establishing the Free and Sovereign State of Jalisco. On March 27, 1824, Santa Maria was given the title of city. On April 9, 1829, the city was renamed as Lagos de Moreno in memory of insurgent General Pedro Moreno (1775-1817), a founding father of Mexico who led forces against Spanish authorities in the Mexican War of Independence.

In 1855, a second and similarly titled Convenio de Lagos (Agreement of Lagos) was signed in Lagos de Moreno, in which Manuel Doblado and Antonio de Haro y Tamariz recognized the Plan of Ayutla, thus joining the movement to topple conservative President Antonio López de Santa Ana. During the Reform War, Lagos de Moreno changed hands between liberal and conservative forces multiple times until an eventual liberal victory in 1861.

During the Mexican Revolution in the 1910s, residents of Lagos de Moreno like Mariano Azuela and Francisco Guerrero Ramirez joined the fighting. In the subsequent Cristero War, the nearby Mesa Redonda was the site of a battle between federal troops and rebel forces.

In 1963, Lagos de Moreno celebrated the 400th anniversary of its founding. In recent times, the city has received several important titles. It has been named an Area of Historical Monuments by the National Institute of Anthropology and History (INAH) in 1989, a World Heritage Site on the Camino Real "Tierra Adentro" by UNESCO on August 1, 2010, and "Pueblo Mágico" by SECTUR on November 16, 2012.

Geography

Climate 
Lagos de Moreno has a subtropical highland climate (Köppen climate classification Cwb) with mild temperatures year round. Temperatures are generally similar for any given month, but daily high and low fluctuations can be very sharp in the winter due in part to the city's altitude and its uneven surroundings. Many days are sunny, averaging around 15-19 clear days per month and precipitation is low. Nighttime temperatures regularly fall below  but extended periods of frost are rare.

The Bajio's two main seasons are the wet season and the dry season. The wet season, which runs from June to October sees an increase in precipitation and humidity with July and August being the wettest months. The table below shows detailed statistics on the climate of Lagos de Moreno.

Topography 
Lagos de Moreno is situated 1,942 meters (6,371 feet) above mean sea level. Lagos is located in the region of Los Altos de Jalisco, within the macroregion of the Bajío, one of the most highly developed areas in Latin America. The city's vicinity is quite mountainous and hilly, with the nearby Mesa Redonda being a particularly notable formation.

Flora and fauna 
The nearby Mesa Redonda is home to many unique species of flora. There, two species of cactus endemic only to Jalisco flourish, with one of these species only being endemic to the Mesa Redonda, particularly its very steep slopes, protecting it from predators.

Many animals call the Lagos valley home, with fauna including hares, rabbits, deers, and boars. Residents of nearby ranches have commented on the presence of coyotes and snakes in rural areas. Areas like the Mesa Redonda have been utilized by locals to gather vegetables straight from nature, particularly prickly pear cacti.

Demographics 
As of the 2010 census, the city had a population of 153,817 inhabitants, making it the 6th largest city in the state of Jalisco. The estimate for the population in 2015 is 164,981 people. Lagos de Moreno has a slightly higher female population compared to males with 79,345 females compared to 74,472 males, meaning that the female population is 6.14% higher than the male population.

Notable natives and residents

Athletics
Luis Fernando Macías, professional cyclist, silver medalist at the 2009 Pan-American Road and Track Championship
Armando Reynoso Gutiérrez, baseball player for the Mexico national team, Mexican Baseball Hall of Fame member
Isaác Brizuela Muñoz, Mexican-American footballer for C.D. Guadalajara
Carmelo Reyes González, former professional wrestler

Culture
Lola Álvarez Bravo, famed photographer, prominent figure of the post-Mexican Revolution artistic renaissance
Juan Pablo Villalobos, author and entrepreneur
José Rosas Moreno, 19th-century writer, fableist, and poet
Mariano Azuela González, 19th/20th-century literary critic, novelist, and essayist

Politics
Pedro de Anda, Spanish conquistador and founder of Lagos de Moreno
Luis Alfonso de Alba Góngora, Mexican under-secretary for Latin America in the Secretary of Foreign Relations, former Mexican Representative to the United Nations
Ramón Muñoz Gutiérrez, Senator of Jalisco in the Mexican Senate of the Republic
Emilio González Márquez, former Governor of Jalisco
Pedro Moreno, general and father of the Mexican War of Independence
Francisco Primo de Verdad y Ramos, 18th-century lawyer and politician of colonial New Spain

Religion
Juan Manuel Martín del Campo, Roman Catholic priest and exorcist, titled as Venerable by Pope Francis

Government

Mayors and municipal presidents 
Subjects and citizens who have served as mayors or municipal presidents of Lagos de Moreno

Gallery

Transportation
The city used to be served by the Francisco Primo de Verdad National Airport . The nearest airport, Del Bajio International Airport (IATA: BJX) is located near Silao, Guanajuato, an hour's drive away.

References

Sources
Link to tables of population data from Census of 2005 INEGI: Instituto Nacional de Estadística, Geografía e Informática
Jalisco Enciclopedia de los Municipios de México

External links

 Fotografias de Lagos de Moreno www.alxkueyar.com
 Laguenses en el exterior www.laguenses.com
 Ayuntamiento de Lagos de Moreno Official website

Municipalities of Jalisco
Pueblos Mágicos
Camino Real de Tierra Adentro